László Megyesi (born 2 May 1977) is a Hungarian footballer who plays for FC Tatabánya as a midfielder.

References

1977 births
Living people
Hungarian footballers
Association football defenders
Békéscsaba 1912 Előre footballers